Cream Ridge Township is a township in Livingston County, in the U.S. state of Missouri.

Cream Ridge Township was established in 1857.

References

Townships in Missouri
Townships in Livingston County, Missouri
1857 establishments in Missouri